Adam Loftus may refer to:   
 Adam Loftus (bishop) (c. 1533–1605), Church of Ireland Archbishop of Armagh and later Archbishop of Dublin
 Adam Loftus, 1st Viscount Loftus (c. 1568–1643), nephew of the Archbishop, Irish peer
 Adam Loftus (politician), grandson of the Archbishop 
 Adam Loftus, 1st Viscount Lisburne (1647–1691), Anglo-Irish peer and military commander